San Donato is a church in Genoa, Northern Italy.

The interior contains a Madonna by the 14th-century painter Nicolò da Voltri; a St Joseph
It dates from the 12th century and is in Romanesque style. It became a parish under archbishop Siro il Porcello, and was consecrated on May 1, 1189.

After the bombardment of 1684 it was restored several times, being again consecrated on December 4, 1892. Other restorations in 1946-1951 have kept its Romanesque appearance.

, by Domenico Piola; and a marble relief of the Baptism of Christ, started by Ignazio Peschiera and completed by his pupil Carlo Rubatto. There is also a triptych (1515) by Joos van Cleve representing The Adoration of the Magi; the person who commissioned the work Stefano Raggi with Guardian Saint ; and a Mary Magdalen. This is topped by a Crucifixion scene with Mary and St John the Evangelist.

External links

Donato
12th-century Roman Catholic church buildings in Italy
Romanesque architecture in Genoa